Paprat is a village in Dzhebel Municipality, Kardzhali Province, southern Bulgaria.

Honours
Paprat Peak on Brabant Island, Antarctica is named after the village.

References

Villages in Kardzhali Province